Silvio Emiliano Dorrego Coito (born 30 March 1987) is a Uruguayan former footballer who played as a defender.

References

1987 births
Living people
Uruguayan footballers
Association football defenders
Uruguayan Primera División players
Uruguayan Segunda División players
Liga I players
C.A. Rentistas players
Juventud de Las Piedras players
FC Botoșani players
C.A. Cerro players
Deportivo Maldonado players
Central Español players
Uruguayan expatriate footballers
Expatriate footballers in Romania 
Uruguayan expatriate sportspeople in Romania
Footballers from Montevideo